,  also known as , was a consort of Emperor Sushun, the 32nd Emperor of Japan who reigned from 587 to 592.

Koteko was the mother of Sushun's only recorded son (Prince Hachiko) and daughter (Princess Nishikite).

According to the Nihongi, Koteko participated indirectly in her husband's assassination.
 "The Imperial concubine Ohotomo no Koteko, incensed at her declining favour, sent a man to Soga no Mumako no Sukune with a message, saying:— "Recently a wild boar was presented to the Emperor. He pointed to it and said :—'When shall the man We think of be cut off as this wild boar's throat has been cut?' Besides weapons are being made in abundance in the Palace." Now Mumako no Sukune, hearing this, was alarmed."
The details of this historical narrative are incoherent without more specific information.  Historians tend to question or to discredit this alleged incident in the traditional narrative because it seems incongruent with what else is known about the Imperial Court in the year of Sushun's death.

Notes

References
 Aston, William George. (1896).  Nihongi: Chronicles of Japan from the Earliest Times to A.D. 697. London: Kegan Paul, Trench, Trubner. 
 Jochi Daigaku. (1989).  Monumenta Nipponica, Vol. 44. Tokyo: Sophia University Press. OCLC 1640509
 Tsunoda, Ryūsaku and William Theodore De Bary. (1958).  Sources of Japanese Tradition. New York: Columbia Univ. Press. ; 

Japanese princesses
Year of birth unknown
Year of death unknown
6th-century Japanese women